Niepaństwowa Wyższa Szkoła Pedagogiczna (The Non-State Higher School of Pedagogy) is a private institution of higher education in Białystok, Poland. It was founded in 1996. It offers courses in pedagogy, psychology and internal security at bachelor and master's degree and also postgraduate studies.

School authorities
 Marek Jasiński, PhD, rector
 Dorota Agata Popławska, PhD, dean of the Faculty of Educational Sciences
 Leontyna Jakoniuk, chancellor
 Maria Kwaśniewska 
 Olga Kamińska

External links
 Official Website

Universities and colleges in Białystok
Educational institutions established in 1996
1996 establishments in Poland